was a Japanese actor. He appeared in more than 70 films between 1953 and 2003. He died of lymphoma on 21 August 2012.

Selected filmography

Film
 Mahiru no ankoku (1956)
 An Actress (1956) - Akio Satomi
 The Burmese Harp (1956) - Pvt. Kobayashi
 Lucky Dragon No. 5 (1959) - Announcer
 The Scent of Incense (1964) - Murata
 The Snow Woman (1968)
 Coup d'Etat (1973) - Army officer
 Shogun Assassin (1980)
 The Battle of Port Arthur (1980) - Narrator
 Chōchin (1987)
 Luminous Moss (1992) - Novelist
 Kamikaze Taxi (1995) - Domon
 My Secret Cache (1997) - Morita
 After Life (1998) - Ichiro Watanabe
 Samurai Fiction (1998) - Kanzen Inukai

Television
 Minamoto no Yoshitsune (1966) - Hitachibō Kaison
 Ōgon no Hibi (1978) - Akechi Mitsuhide
 Tokugawa Ieyasu (1983) - Honda Masanobu
 Sanga Moyu (1984) - Taketora Matsui
 Musashibō Benkei (1986) - Hōjō Tokimasa
 Takeda Shingen (1988) - Gishū
 Hana no Ran (1994) - Ichijō Kaneyoshi
 Aoi (2000) - Ishida Masatsugu
 Sakura (2002) - Daisaku Akebono

References

External links

1926 births
2012 deaths
Japanese male film actors
People from Kitakyushu
Deaths from lymphoma
20th-century Japanese male actors